Talmont-sur-Gironde (literally Talmont on Gironde) is a commune in the Charente-Maritime department in the Nouvelle-Aquitaine region in southwestern France.

Geography
It appears to be ‘perched’ on this rocky outcrop, in the way that it occupies every square millimetre of space. Tiny beaches can be found at the base of the fortifications, which mostly are sheer from the sea. Inland there is marshy country and a small waterway runs alongside the south wall of the village.

Population

Sights

The village is a member of the Les Plus Beaux Villages de France ("The most beautiful villages of France") association.

The village is known for its show of hollyhocks, which intrude on the tiny pedestrian-only streets between the small houses.

Church of St Radegonde
The church of St Radegonde was built in 1094. The structure appears quite 'squat' and is Romanesque in character. The church was a resting place for the Pilgrimage of Saint James of Compostela on the via Turonensis, because the pilgrims crossed the Gironde at this spot (Voie de Soulac Littoral Aquitain).

History
The enclosed and fortified village was founded around the church in 1284, according to the plans of the ancient bastides, on the orders of Edward I of England. During the Hundred Years' War which divided England and France, Talmont became a strategic stake. In 1652, the village was destroyed by the Spaniards.

Personalities
Louis II de la Trémoille, prince of Talmont.

See also
Communes of the Charente-Maritime department
The pilgrimage of St James of Compostela

References

External links

Voie de Soulac 
Via Turonensis 

Communes of Charente-Maritime
Plus Beaux Villages de France
Charente-Maritime communes articles needing translation from French Wikipedia
Populated coastal places in France